This is a list of notable Muslim theologians.

Traditional Theologians and Philosophers

Ash'aris and Maturidis 

 Abu al-Hasan al-Ash'ari
 Abu Mansur al-Maturidi
 Abu al-Yusr al-Bazdawi
 Abu al-Mu'in al-Nasafi
 Shahab_al-Din_Abu_Hafs_Umar_Suhrawardi
 Ibn Hibban
 Ibn Furak
 Abu Mansur al-Baghdadi
 Abu Ishaq al-Isfara'ini
 Abu al-Walid al-Baji
 Abu Bakr ibn al-Arabi
 Al-Bayhaqi
 Al-Baqillani
 Al-Qushayri
 Al-Shahrastani
 Al-Juwayni
 Ahmad al-Rifa'i
 Al-Ghazali
 Al-Baydawi
 Al-Maziri
 Ali Qushji
 Ali al-Qari
 Al-Sharif al-Jurjani
 Fakhr al-Din al-Razi
 Sayf al-Din al-Amidi
 Izz al-Din ibn 'Abd al-Salam
 Taqi al-Din al-Subki
 Taj al-Din al-Subki
 Jalal al-Din al-Dawani
 Zakariyya al-Ansari
 Ibn Aqil
 Ibn al-Jawzi
 Ibn Khaldun
 Ibn Tumart
 Ibn Arafa
 Ibn Ashir
 'Illish
 Ibn Abi Zayd
 Qadi Ayyad
 Ibn Hajar al-Haytami
 Shams al-Din al-Samarqandi
 Najm al-Din 'Umar al-Nasafi
 Sa'd al-Din al-Taftazani
 Najm al-Din al-Qazwini al-Katibi
 Shihab al-Din al-Qarafi
 Abu Hayyan al-Gharnati
 Abu Ali al-Hassan al-Yusi
 Abdel Qadir al-Jilani
 Abd al-Rahman al-Thaalbi
 Abd al-Rahman al-Fasi
 Abd al-Ghani al-Nabulsi
 Al-Maqqari al-Tilmisani
 Al-Sha'rani
 Al-Bahūtī
 Al-Maydani
 Ad-Desouki
 Ahmad Sirhindi
 Ahmad al-Dardir
 Ibrahim al-Bajuri
 Abdullah ibn Alawi al-Haddad
 Shah Waliullah Dehlawi
 Ahmad Rida Khan
 Rahmatullah Kairanawi
 Muhammad Zahid al-Kawthari
 Muhammad Mayyara
 Murtada al-Zabidi
 Muhammad Abu Zahra
 Yusuf al-Nabhani
 Muhammad Metwally al-Sha'rawy
 Ahmed Deedat
 Abdullah al-Harari
 Muhammad Said Ramadan al-Bouti
 Muhammad Alawi al-Maliki
 Noah Qudah
 Ali Gomaa

Mu'tazilis 

 Wasil ibn 'Ata'
 Al-Qadi 'Abd al-Jabbar
 Al-Jubba'i
 Al-Jahiz
 Al-Zamakhshari
 Ibrahim al-Nazzam

Others 
 Abu Muslim
 Al-Dinawari
 Al-Farabi
  Sayyid Ali Hamadani 
 Al-Kindi
 Ibn Hazm
 Ibn Sina
 Ibn Taymiya
 Ibn al-Qayyim

See also early Muslim philosophy, Islamic philosophy

Early Sunni Theologians and Philosophers 
 Abu Hanifa
 Al-Shafi‘i
 Malik ibn Anas
 Ahmad ibn Hanbal
 Dawud al-Zahiri
 Tahawi
 Junayd of Baghdad
 Harith al-Muhasibi

Imams of Hadith
 Bukhari
 Muslim
 Abu Da'ud
 Tirmidhi
 Nasa'i
 Ibn Maja

Medieval Theologians and Philosophers 
 Al-Biruni
 Al-Battani (Albatenius)
 Al-Buzjani
 Al-Farabi (Alpharabius)
 Al-Farghani
 Al-Ghazali (Algazel)
 Al-Idrisi
 Al-Zarnuji
 Al-Khwarizmi (Algoritmi)
 Al-Kindi (Alkindus)
 Al-Masu'di
 Al-Mawardi
 Ibn al-Baitar
 Ibn al-Haytham (Alhazen)
 Ibn al-Nafis
 Ibn Khaldun
 Ibn Rushd (Averroes)
 Ibn Sina (Avicenna)
 Jalal al-Din Muhammad Rumi
Kemalpaşazade
Molla Fenari
 Omar Khayyám
 Sayyid Ali Hamadani (Preacher and traveller)

Modern theologians 
 Sa'id Foudah
 A F M Khalid Hossain
 Abdul Baqi Miftah
 Abdolkarim Soroush
 Abdur Rahman Bangladeshi
 Abdul Halim Bukhari
 Abdul Matin Chowdhury
 Abdul Qadeer Khan
 Ahmed Rida Khan
 Allama Khalid Mahmood
 Ashraf Ali Thanwi
 Akhtar Raza Khan
 Ali Shariati
 Alija Izetbegović
 Anwar Shah Kashmiri
 Bilal Philips
 Ebrahim Desai
 Fazlur Rahman
 Hussain Ahmed Madani
 Idries Shah
 Inayat Khan
 Ismail Al-Faruqi
 Israr Ahmed
 Junaid Babunagari
 Khaled Abou Al-Fadl
 Leila Ahmed
 Mahmudul Hasan
 Mamunul Haque
 Mahmud Hasan Deobandi
 Mawlana Muhammad Ilyas
 Muhammad Abdul Wahhab
 Mohammed Amine Smaili
 Muhammad Asadullah Al-Ghalib
 Muhammad Ilyas al-Kandhlawi
 Muhammad Rafi Usmani
 Muhammad Shafi Deobandi
 Muhammad Taqi Usmani
 Muhammad Zakariyya al-Kandhlawi
 Muhammad Tahir-ul-Qadri
 Muzaffer Ozak
 Nurul Islam Olipuri
 Nasiruddin Albani
 Nur Hossain Kasemi
 Nur Uddin Gohorpuri
 Shah Ahmad Shafi
 Shabbir Ahmad Usmani
 Said Nursi
 Sayyid Abul Ala Maududi
 Shams-ul-haq Azeemabadi
 Sherman Jackson
 Seyyed Hossein Nasr
 Siraj Wahaj
 Syed Muhammad Naquib al-Attas
 Syed Nazeer Husain
 Tariq Jameel
 Yusuf Motala
 Ziauddin Sardar

See also modern Islamic philosophy, Islamization of knowledge

Shi'a Imams

Athnā‘ashariyyah-The Twelve Imams 
Ali ibn Abi Talib
Hasan ibn Ali
Husayn ibn Ali
Ali ibn Husayn Zayn al-Abidin 
Muhammad al-Baqir
Jafar Sadiq
Musa al-Kazim
Ali al-Rida (Ali Raza)
Muhammad al-Taqi
Ali al-Hadi (Ali Naqi)
Hasan al-Askari 
Muhammad al-Mahdi

Zaidiyyah Imams
Ali ibn Abu Talib
Hasan ibn Ali
Husayn ibn Ali
Ali ibn Husayn Zayn al-Abidin 
Zayd ibn Ali

Isma'ili Imams
Ali ibn Abu Talib (Nizari Isma'ili and Qarmatian-Sevener only; Asās/Wāsīh in Musta'li Isma'ili)
Hasan ibn Ali (Qarmatian-Sevener and Musta'li Isma'ili only; Pir in Nizari)
Husayn ibn Ali
Ali ibn Husayn Zayn al-Abidin 
Muhammad al-Baqir
Jafar Sadiq
Ismāʿīl ibn Jaʿfar
Maymūn Al-Qaddāḥ (Musta'li and Nizari Isma'ili only)

Others 
 Al-Shaykh Al-Mufid
 Sharif al-Murtaza
 Nasir al-Din al-Tusi
 Al-Hilli
 Zurarah ibn A'yan
 Hisham ibn Hakam
 Agha Zia Addin Araghi
 Ja'far Sobhani

Historiographers, political scientists, and sociologists 
 Al-Masudi
 Ibn al-Tiqtaqa
 Ibn Hisham
 Ibn Ishaq
 Ibn Kathir
 Ibn Khaldoun
 Ibn Khallikan
 Mahdi ElMandjra
 Rashid-al-Din Hamadani
 Sayyid Qutb
 Tabari
 Usamah ibn Munqidh

See also 
 Kalam
 Aqidah
 List of people by belief
 List of Ash'aris and Maturidis
 List of Muslims
 Western Muslim scholars

 
Muslim theolog
Theologians